The Comptroller General of the State (IGAE) is a senior official of the Ministry of Finance of Spain. The comptroller directs the Office of the Comptroller General of the State Administration, which is an internal supervisory agency with the task of supervising the state public administration and of managing the public accounts.

The Comptroller General is appointed by the Monarch with the advice of the Finance Minister. The Comptroller General reports directly to the Under Secretary of Finance.

Purpose 
The Comptroller oversees the IGAE agency, which has two core functions. Its primary function is that of a supervisory agency. It is responsible for verifying – through previous monitoring of legality, continuous financial control, public audits, and financial control of subsidies – that the public sector's economic and financial activity complies with the principles of legality, economy, efficiency and effectiveness.

Its second function is to act as the center for the management of public accounts. It is responsible for providing reliable, complete, professional and independent accounting information about public management. In this regard, it is responsible for drafting the public sector's financial accounts according to the guidance set out by the European System of Accounts.  The most specific result of this is the determination of public deficit, which is essential to the nation's economic life. It calculates the deficit for the central government and each of its sub-sectors.

Organisation
A large number of officials and administrative bodies depend upon the Comptroller General. To carry out its functions, the IGAE agency has delegations known as Comptroller Delegations in all the General State Administration departments, including ministerial departments, public agencies and regional and local administrations. In addition, the law specifies that certain government bodies must have integrated delegations: Ministry of Defence (IGD), Social Security (IGSS), the General Secretariat for the Treasury and International Financing, and the Directorate-General for Personnel Costs and Public Pensions.

In addition to the bodies mentioned above, the IGAE agency is divided into seven large departments:
 The National Audit Office, further divided into five division.
 The National Accounting Office, divided into three divisions.
 The Deputy Directorate-General for Intervention and Control.
 The Deputy Directorate-General for Studies and Coordination.
 The Deputy Directorate-General for Organization, Planning and Resource Management.
 The Budgetary Computing Office, divided into four divisions.
 The National Anti-Fraud Coordination Service.

It is also supported by a dedicated technical office.

List of Comptrollers General

References

Government audit officials
Auditing organizations
Financial regulatory authorities of Spain
Auditing in Spain
Government agencies of Spain